Steven Howell Jones (born April 22, 1941) is a former left-handed Major League Baseball pitcher who played from 1967 to 1969 for the Chicago White Sox, Washington Senators and Kansas City Royals. He is the brother of fellow former major leaguer Gary Jones.

Prior to playing professional baseball, he attended Whittier College. In 1962, he was signed by the Minnesota Twins as an amateur free agent. On December 2, 1963, he was drafted by the White Sox in the minor league draft. He made his big league debut with the White Sox on August 15, 1967. He started the game, lasting only 4 innings and allowing eight hits, one walk and three earned runs including a home run to Rick Monday. He went 2-2 with a 4.21 ERA in 11 games (three starts) in his first season.

On February 13, 1968, he was traded with Ron Hansen and Dennis Higgins to the Senators for Tim Cullen, Buster Narum and Bob Priddy. He appeared in seven games for the Senators in 1968, going 1-2 with a 5.91 ERA. He was taken as the 10th pick in the 1968 MLB expansion draft by the Royals. He pitched only one season for them, going 2-3 with a 4.23 ERA in 20 games (four games started). On September 21, 1969, he appeared in his final big league game.

Overall, Jones went 5-7 with a 4.44 ERA in 38 games (seven started). In 81 innings, he allowed 74 hits, 43 walks and 59 strikeouts.

References

External links
, or Pura Pelota (Venezuelan Winter League)

1941 births
Living people
Baseball players from California
Buffalo Bisons (minor league) players
Chicago White Sox players
Erie Sailors players
Florida Instructional League White Sox players
Indianapolis Indians players
Kansas City Royals players
Lynchburg White Sox players
Major League Baseball pitchers
Navegantes del Magallanes players
American expatriate baseball players in Venezuela
Omaha Royals players
People from Huntington Park, California
Rochester Red Wings players
Sportspeople from Los Angeles County, California
Washington Senators (1961–1971) players
Wichita Aeros players
Wilson Tobs players
Whittier Poets baseball players